Putyovka is a rural locality (a settlement) in Bryansky District, Bryansk Oblast, Russia. Population:  4,736 (2010). There are 73 streets.

Geography 
Putyovka is located 16 km southeast of Glinishchevo (the district's administrative centre) by road. Kuzmino is the nearest rural locality.

References 

Rural localities in Bryansky District